Basham is an unincorporated community in Montgomery County, Virginia, United States.

A post office was established at Basham in 1882, and remained in operation until it was discontinued in 1955. The Frank Lawrence House was listed on the National Register of Historic Places in 1989.

References

Unincorporated communities in Montgomery County, Virginia
Unincorporated communities in Virginia